Senator Gallivan may refer to:

James A. Gallivan (1866–1928), Massachusetts State Senate
Patrick M. Gallivan (born 1960), New York State Senate